Janata Dal (“People’s Party”) was an Indian political party which was formed through the merger of Janata Party factions, the Lok Dal, Indian National Congress (Jagjivan), and the Jan Morcha united on 11 October 1988 on the birth anniversary of Jayaprakash Narayan under the leadership of V. P. Singh.

History
V. P. Singh united the entire disparate spectrum of parties ranging from regional parties such as the Telugu Desam Party, the Dravida Munnetra Kazhagam, and the Asom Gana Parishad, together and formed the National Front with N. T. Rama Rao as Indian Election History President and V. P. Singh as convenor with outside support from the (Right-wing Political party) Bharatiya Janata Party and (Left-wing Political party) Communist Party of India, Communist Party of India (Marxist) led Left front. They defeated Rajiv Gandhi's Congress (I) in the 1989 parliamentary elections.
His government fell after Lalu Prasad Yadav, got Advani arrested in Samastipur and stopped his Ram Rath Yatra which was going to Ayodhya on the site of the Babri Masjid on October 23, 1990 and the Bharatiya Janata Party withdrew support. V.P. Singh lost a parliamentary vote of confidence on November 7, 1990.
In the 1991 Indian general election the Janata Dal lost power but emerged as the third largest party in Lok Sabha.
Janata Dal-led United Front formed the government after the 1996 Indian general election with the outside support of the Indian National Congress. But after this the Janata Dal gradually disintegrated into various smaller factions, largely regional parties Biju Janata Dal, Rashtriya Janata Dal, Janata Dal (Secular) and Janata Dal (United).

Ascent to power

It first came to power in 1989, after allegations of corruption, known as the Bofors scandal, caused Rajiv Gandhi's Congress (I) to lose the elections. The National Front coalition that was formed consisted of the Janata Dal and a few smaller parties in the government, and had outside support from the Left Front and the Bharatiya Janata Party. V. P. Singh was the prime minister. In November 1990, this coalition collapsed, and a new government headed by Chandra Shekhar under Samajwadi Janata Party (Rashtriya) which had the support of the congress came to power for a short while. Two days before the vote, Chandra Shekhar, an ambitious Janata Dal rival who had been kept out of the National Front government, joined with Devi Lal, a former deputy prime minister under V.P. Singh, to form the Samajwadi Janata Party, with a total of just sixty Lok Sabha members. The day after the collapse of the National Front government, Chandra Shekhar informed the president that by gaining the backing of the Congress (I) and its electoral allies he enjoyed the support of 280 members of the Lok Sabha, and he demanded the right to constitute a new government. Even though his rump party accounted for only one-ninth of the members of the Lok Sabha, Chandra Shekhar succeeded in forming a new minority Government and becoming Prime Minister (with Devi Lal as deputy prime minister). However, Chandra Shekhar's government fell less than four months later, after the Congress (I) withdrew its support.

Its second spell of power began in 1996, when the Janata Dal-led United Front coalition came to power, with outside support from the congress under Sitaram Kesri, choosing H. D. Deve Gowda as their prime minister. The congress withdrew their support in less than a year, hoping to gain power with the support of various United Front constituent groups, and I. K. Gujral became the next prime minister. His government too fell in a few months, and in February 1998, the Janata Dal-led coalition lost power to the Bharatiya Janata Party.

List of prime ministers

Vice President of India
Krishan Kant

Party Presidents 
V P Singh (1989)

Sharad Yadav (1999)

National Units 

Thakur Ji Pathak (1989 – 1994)
|Position = National General Secretary

State Units

Uttar pradesh 
Anantram Jaiswal (1983)

Karnataka

Presidents 
B. Rachaiah (1989)

Siddaramaiah (Feb 1999)

C. Byre Gowda (July 1999)

General Secretary 
Jeevaraj Alva (1989-1990)

C. Narayanaswamy (1999)

Tamil Nadu

President     
Sivaji Ganesan

Janata Dal factions

Pro-National Democratic Alliance parties
 Jannayak Janata Party (JJP) led by Ajay Singh Chautala.
 Rashtriya Lok Janshakti Party led by Pashupati Kumar Paras.
 Hindustani Awam Morcha (Secular) led by Jitan Ram Manjhi.
 Samata Party of Late George Fernandes and now led by Uday Mandal.
 Socialist Janata Dal led by V. V. Rajendran.
 Lok Aawaz Dal led by Shambhu Sharan Shrivastava.

Pro-United Progressive Alliance parties
 Indian Socialist Party led by Thampan Thomas.
 Janata Dal (United) led by Nitish Kumar.
 Rashtriya Janata Dal led by Lalu Prasad Yadav.

Non-NDA/UPA parties
 Biju Janata Dal led by Naveen Patnaik.
 Janata Dal (Secular) led by H. D. Deve Gowda. 
 Samajwadi Party of Late Mulayam Singh Yadav and now led by Akhilesh Yadav.
 Lok Janshakti Party (Ram Vilas) led by Chirag Paswan.
 Indian National Lok Dal (INLD) led by Om Prakash Chautala.
 Rashtriya Lok Dal of Late Ajit Singh and now led by Jayant Chaudhary.
 Jan Adhikar Party Loktantrik led by Pappu Yadav.
 Garib Janta Dal (Secular) led by Sadhu Yadav.
 Samajwadi Janata Party (Rashtriya) of Late Chandra Shekhar and now led by Kamal Morarka.
 Loktantrik Samajwadi Party led by Raghu Thakur.
 Samajwadi Jan Parishad of Late Kishen Pattanayak and now led by Kamal Banerjee.
 Samajwadi Janata Dal Democratic led by Devendra Prasad Yadav.
 Odisha Jan Morcha of Late Pyarimohan Mohapatra.
 Samata Kranti Dal led by Braja Kishore Tripathy.
 Socialist Party (India) of Late Bhai Vaidya and Dr. Prem Singh.
 Akhil Bhartiya Socialist Party led by Harinarain Mishra.
 Bharatiya Sablog Party led by Arun Kumar.

Defunct parties
 Lok Janshakti Party of Late Ram Vilas Paswan and led by Chirag Paswan (split into the Lok Janshakti Party (Ram Vilas) led by Ram's son Chirag Paswan, and the Rashtriya Lok Janshakti Party led by Ram's brother Pashupati Kumar Paras).
 Rashtriya Lok Samata Party led by Upendra Kushwaha (merged with Janata Dal United).
 Loktantrik Janata Dal led by Sharad Yadav (merged with Rashtriya Janata Dal).
 Socialist Janata Party led by Manju Mohan (merged with Socialist Party (India)).
 Samras Samaj Party led by Nagmani (merged with Rashtriya Lok Samata Party). 
 Socialist Janata (Democratic) Party led by M. P. Veerendra Kumar (merged with Janata Dal (United))
 Jan Morcha of Late V. P. Singh and led by Ajeya Pratap Singh (merged with Indian National Congress)
 Odisha Gana Parishad led by  Bijoy Mohapatra (merged with Nationalist Congress Party)
 All India Progressive Janata Dal led by Late Ramakrishna Hegde and Late S. R. Bommai (merged with Janata Dal (United))
 Janata Dal (Left) led by Late Surendra Mohan and M. P. Veerendra Kumar (merged with Janata Dal (Secular))
 Lok Shakti led by Late Ramakrishna Hegde (merged with Janata Dal (United))
Pragatisheel Samajwadi Party (Lohiya) led by Shivpal Singh Yadav (merged with Samajwadi Party)
 Janata Dal (Gujarat) led by Late Chimanbhai Patel and Late Chhabildas Mehta (merged with Indian National Congress)
 Janata Dal (Digvijay) led by Digvijay Singh (merged with Bharatiya Janata Party)
 Janata Dal (Ajit) led by Ajit Singh (merged with Indian National Congress)
 Janata Dal (Socialist) led by Late Chandra Shekhar, Devi Lal, Mulayam Singh Yadav (renamed as Late Samajwadi Janata Party (Rashtriya))
 Punjab Janata Morcha (PJM), in English the Punjab Popular Front, was a Sikh political party in the Indian state of Punjab. The party formed in 1989 as a splinter group of the Janata Dal. The party failed to win any election seats in its lifetime. Party president Kirpal Singh announced that the PJM was disbanded in 1997. Most members joined the Jan Morcha by 2003.

See also 

 Samata Party
 List of Janata Dal breakaway parties

References

 
Political parties in India
V. P. Singh administration
1988 establishments in India
1999 disestablishments in India
Political parties disestablished in 1999
Political parties established in 1988